is a city in Hyōgo Prefecture, Japan. , the city had an estimated population of 28,208 in 13143 households and a population density of 310 persons per km².

Geography 
Aioi is located in southwestern Hyōgo Prefecture extending largely south to north. The city's northern region is mountainous, the southern region faces the Seto Inland Sea.The area around the urban center, with Mt. Minosan in the north, Mt. Tengadai in the east, and Mt. Miya in the west, is a basin surrounded by small mountains.

Neighboring Municipalities 
Hyōgo Prefecture
 Tatsuno
 Akō

Climate
Aioi has a Humid subtropical climate (Köppen Cfa) characterized by warm summers and cool winters with light to no snowfall.  The average annual temperature in Aioi is 15.0 °C. The average annual rainfall is 1519 mm with September as the wettest month. The temperatures are highest on average in August, at around 26.0 °C, and lowest in January, at around 4.6 °C.

Demographics
Per Japanese census data, the population of Aioi has remained relatively constant over the past 70 years.

History 
The Aioi area was part of ancient Harima Province and was located on the San'yō highway linking western Japan with the Kinai region. The area was the location of a stronghold of the Ebina clan, originally from Sagami Province, who were retainers of the powerful Akamatsu clan. In the Edo period, the area became part of the holdings of Akō Domain. It was raised to town status on January 1, 1913, becoming . The town merged with the neighboring town of Naba on April 1, 1939 and the reading of the kanji of its name was officially changed to "Aioi" on April 13, 1939. It was raised to city status on October 1, 1942. Aioi merged with the villages of Wakasano and Yano on April 1, 1954.

Government
Aioi has a mayor-council form of government with a directly elected mayor and a unicameral city council of 14 members. Aioi contributes one member to the Hyogo Prefectural Assembly. In terms of national politics, the city is part of Hyōgo 12th district of the lower house of the Diet of Japan.

Economy
Aioi has traditionally been famous for shipbuilding, which, despite many years of decline, still maintains a strong presence through Ishikawajima-Harima Heavy Industries (IHI). The city is increasing becoming a bedroom community, with 25.0% of those commuting to work going to Tatsuno or Himeji. (2010 National Census).

Education
Aioi has seven public elementary schools and three public middle schools operated by the city government and two public high schools operated by the Hyōgo Prefectural Department of Education. There is also one private high school.

Transportation

Railway 
 JR West – San'yō Shinkansen
 
 JR West – San'yō Main Line / Akō Line
  -

Highways 
  San'yō Expressway
  Harima Expressway

Local attractions

Kanjōsan Castle ruins, National Historic Site
, with dragon boat races, which takes place on the last weekend of May each year. In 1655, the dragon boat races were brought from China to Nagasaki. Later in 1922, some Nagasaki IHI workers were transferred to Aioi.

Daikon
In November 2005, the city was mentioned in world news reports after a large daikon radish that grew though the pavement was found slashed.  According to a city spokesperson, the radish was seen as an inspiration due to "its tenacity and strong will to live." The tenacious daikon, nicknamed "Daichan," has since been celebrated in a children's book. In 2006, a special firework representing the daikon was set off at the annual firework display preceding the dragon boat races.

Noted people from Aioi
Kirio Urayama, film director
Ikuo Oyama, politician
Yoshito Yasuhara, voice actor
Tsuyoshi Yamaguchi, politician

References

External links 

 Aioi City official website 
 History of the dragon boat races 

Cities in Hyōgo Prefecture
Populated coastal places in Japan
Aioi, Hyōgo